3,4-dihydroxyphenylalanine oxidative deaminase (3,4-dihydroxy-L-phenylalanine: oxidative deaminase, oxidative deaminase, DOPA oxidative deaminase, DOPAODA) is an enzyme with systematic name 3,4-dihydroxy-L-phenylalanine:oxygen oxidoreductase (deaminating). This enzyme catalyses the following chemical reaction

 2 L-dopa + O2  2 3,4-dihydroxyphenylpyruvate + 2 NH3

This enzyme is one of the three enzymes involved in L-dopa (3,4-dihydroxy-L-phenylalanine) catabolism in the bacterium Rubrivivax benzoatilyticus.

References

External links 
 

EC 1.13.12